Inishsirrer is a small island and a townland off the coast of Gweedore, County Donegal, Ireland.

Geography
Near the northern tip of the island there is a sandy bay that can be used for anchoring boats.

History
A small community used to live on Inishsirrer in the first part of the 20th century, but today the island is uninhabited and its old buildings are mostly ruined.

Fishing
Inishsirrer was known as a good spot for lobster fishing.

See also

 List of islands of Ireland

References

Image gallery

External links

 Guide to the island

Geography of Gweedore
Islands of County Donegal
Townlands of County Donegal
Uninhabited islands of Ireland